Tim Exile (or Exile) is the recording alias of Tim Shaw, a producer and performer of electronic music spanning drum and bass, IDM, breakcore and gabber.

History

A classically trained violinist, he began experimenting with electronic music aged 12, and gained his first drum and bass release in 1999.  In the following years he released mostly for the legendary Moving Shadow imprint, and John B's Beta Recordings, having met John B at Durham University.  After the completion of his philosophy degree, he went on to study an MA in electroacoustic composition at Durham.  Perhaps unsurprisingly, his drum and bass grew increasingly experimental, and his debut LP (Pro Agonist, 2005) was released by Mike Paradinas' Planet Mu label, more commonly associated with the IDM scene.

Unsatisfied with the possibilities of conventional DJing, Exile programmed his own performance tools (at first using Pure Data and running into difficulties, he then switched to Reaktor) to allow improvisational live sets, which led to official work for Native Instruments.

In 2009 he contributed a cover of a Jamie Lidell song to the Warp20 (Recreated) compilation. He also toured the US in late 2009 supporting and collaborating live with Imogen Heap.

In 2012, at Sonar Festival in Barcelona, he teamed up with Jamie Lidell, DJ Shiftee, Mr. Jimmy and Jeremy Ellis to form Mostly Robot, a new collaborative project.

In 2016, he launched Endlesss, a collaborative music-making app inspired by his Flow Machine, which he had previously used in live performances. A desktop version of Endlesss was released in 2020.

Discography
Hanzo Steel Cuts EP (Mosquito, 2004)
Pro Agonist (Planet Mu, 2005) (as Exile)
Tim Exile's Nuisance Gabbaret Lounge (Planet Mu, 2006)
Listening Tree (Warp, 2009)
Harmuni EP (Leisure System, 2013)

References

External links

 Official site
 
 Planet Mu: Tim Exile
 
 Public Q&A at dogsonacid.com
 Remix interview (2006)
 BBC interview (2005)
 Endlesss

Alumni of Durham University
Living people
English drum and bass musicians
Year of birth missing (living people)
Warp (record label) artists